Amour (also known as Ways of Women) is a 1970 Danish drama film directed by Gabriel Axel.

Cast 
1st episode,  1200
  - Diderik
 Tine Bjerregaard – Gundelil
  - Kjartan
 Helmer Johansen – Ebbesen
 André Sallyman – 1. karl
 Berd Jönsson – 2. karl
2nd episode,  1910
 Ghita Nørby – Elisa
 Jacques Mauclair – Elisas mand
  - Elisas elsker
 Kim Meyer – Sønnen
 Kirsten Lyngholm – Datteren
 Paul Hüttel – 1. tyv
  - 2. tyv
 Hans W. Petersen – Frisørmesteren
 Karl Stegger – Konditoren
 Dirch Passer – Gas- og vandmesteren
  - Hans kone
 Jesper Langberg – Kulmanden
  - Kulmandens kone
 Ove Sprogøe – Gammel, døv dame
 Svend Erik Jensen – Politimesteren
 Carl Ottosen – Betjent
 Preben Nicolaisen – Betjent
 Gerd Vindahl – Betjent
 Ib Sørensen – Betjent
 Morten Grunwald – Brandmajoren
 Paul Hagen – Brandmand
 Klaus Pagh – Brandmand
 Kurt Andersen – Brandmand
 Svend Krogh – Brandmand
3rd episode,  1840
 Nadine Alari – Constance Vernon
 Bernard Noël – Adolphe Vernon
  - Philippe Despres
  - Constances veninde
 Jacques François Zeller – Venindens mand
 Monique Mauclair – Venindens datter
 Philippe Baron – Venindens søn
 Robert Burnier – En gammel herre
 Lucienne Givry – En gammel dame
  - Kusken
 Karine Jeantet – Tjenestepigen

References

External links 
 
 
 

1970 films
1970 drama films
Danish drama films
1970s Danish-language films
Films directed by Gabriel Axel